Spinkhill railway station is a disused railway station in Spinkhill, Derbyshire, England.

History
The station was built by the Lancashire, Derbyshire and East Coast Railway on their Beighton Branch, within sight of the northern portal of Spinkhill Tunnel. It opened in 1898 and closed to regular timetabled passenger traffic in 1939, though start and end of term special trains for pupils at the nearby Mount St Mary's College continued for some years thereafter.

The line through the station was closed as a through route on 9 January 1967 but trains continued to serve the nearby Westthorpe Colliery until it closed in 1984. This involved using the former running lines and the sidings behind the station house.

Modern times
The humpback bridge over the trackbed between the station and the tunnel survives, as does the station house, which is now a private residence. The tunnel can still be discerned but is now overgrown. The track through the station site and tunnel was lifted after the closure of the line when the colliery closed.

References

Notes

Sources

External links 
 The station and line on various navigable historic maps National Library of Scotland
 The station and line on various navigable historic maps Rail Map Online
 Spinkhill railway station on navigable 1955 O.S. map npe Maps
 The station in its last years RCTS
 The station in its last years RCTS
 The station and signalbox flickr
 The station, bridge and tunnel flickr
 Ticket to Spink Hill (original spelling) Old Miner

 

Disused railway stations in Derbyshire
Former Lancashire, Derbyshire and East Coast Railway stations
Railway stations in Great Britain opened in 1898
Railway stations in Great Britain closed in 1939